This is list of the Bible translations to Chinese language.

Bible translations into Chinese began with translations made by the Church of the East under the Tang Dynasty into Old Chinese. However, no surviving manuscripts exist, and the only surviving evidence of this is the Nestorian Stele. 

The next instance of Bible translations into Chinese languages subsists in unpublished manuscripts by individual Roman Catholic priests in the sixteenth century and individual Protestant missionaries in the early  nineteenth century. The first complete translation to be published was that of Joshua Marshman in 1813, followed by that of Robert Morrison in 1823. A group of Protestant missionaries in Hong Kong in 1843 started a collaborative translation. The New Testament of their so-called "Delegates Version" was published in 1850 and the Old Testament in 1853. A translation of the Old Testament by Karl Gutzlaff, first published in 1840, was widely distributed and was used by the leaders of the Taiping Rebellion as the basis of their theological study.

The second half of the century saw the publication of Chinese Bibles in regional languages using romanization rather than Chinese characters, the first works printed in the regional language. The Classical Chinese of the Delegates Version could not be understood when read aloud, and towards the end of the century the national missionary body started a revision which used vernacular Chinese. The resulting Union Version, published in 1919, became the standard translation for Protestants and was adapted and published in different forms, including Braille. A Chinese New Version was published in 1992 and a Revised Chinese Union Version in the early twenty-first century.

The Studium Biblicum Version, now the standard Chinese Bible for Catholics, was started in the 1930s and published in 1968. Starting in the 1850s, there have been three Russian Orthodox translations.

Classical Chinese
 New Testament by Archimandrite Guri (Karpov) (新遺詔聖經), 1864
 New Testament by Bishop Innokenty (Figourovsky), 1910
 New Testament and Paraphrase of Psalms (John C. H. Wu and preface written by Pope Pius XII), 1946

Mandarin Chinese

Northern Mandarin
 New Testament of Robert Morrison (missionary) (馬禮遜; simplified Chinese: 马礼逊; pinyin: Mǎ Lǐxùn) 1813
 Old Testament (Samuel Isaac Joseph Schereschewsky), 1875 Internet Archive
 New Testament (Peking Committee), 1870
 New Testament of Griffith John  (杨格非译本), 1887
 Romanized Vernacular Version New Testament, 1889
 Portions of New Testament for the Blind
 Chinese Union Version (和合本 Héhéběn), 1919 United Bible Societies (HK), Amity Printing Company (PRC)
 Studium Biblicum Version, Scotus Chinese Version (思高本 Sīgāoběn), 1968 Amity Printing Company (PRC)
 Today's Chinese Version (現代中文譯本 Xiandai zhongwen yiben), 1975, 1979 United Bible Societies (HK), Amity Printing Company (PRC)
 New Chinese Version (新译本 Xinyiben), Worldwide Bible Society (环球圣经会) 1992
 Chinese Living Bible (当代圣经 Dangdai Shengjing)  New Testament translation of the International Bible Society 1998
 Pastoral Bible (Chinese) (牧灵圣经 Muling Shengjing) 1999  Amity Printing Company (PRC)
 New World Translation of the Holy Scriptures (NWT 新世界译本 Xīnshìjiè-Yìběn), 2001. Available in simplified characters, traditional characters, and simplified with Pinyin.
 Chinese Standard Bible (CSB 中文标准译本 Zhongwen biaozhun yiben), New Testament, Global Bible Initiative and Holman Bible Publishers 2011
 Chinese NET Bible (NET圣经 中译本), 2011-2012
 Contemporary Chinese Version (CCV), The New Testament,《圣经．新汉语译本》 Chinese Bible International (汉语圣经协会) 2010 
 Chinese New Living Translation 《圣经．新普及译本》 Chinese Bible International (汉语圣经协会) 2012
 Contemporary Chinese Version (CCV), The New Pentateuch,《五經．新汉语译本》 Chinese Bible International (汉语圣经协会) 2014

Southern Mandarin
 New Testament, 1856

Western Mandarin

Wu Chinese

Hankou dialect
 Book of Mark, 1921 using the Wangchao phonetic system.

Suzhou dialect
 New Testament, 1881

Shanghai dialect

Character Colloquial Versions
 Isaiah-Daniel, 1886
 New Testament, 1870
Romanized Vernacular Versions
 New Testament, 1870

Ningbo dialect 

 

Romanized Vernacular Versions
 Isaiah, 1870
 New Testament, 1850-1868 (Hudson Taylor, Frederick Foster Gough, Wang Laijun, others)

Hangzhou dialect
Romanized Vernacular Versions
 New Testament (parts of it), 1877 by the English Bible Society.
 Gospel of John, 1879 by the Anglican Missionary G.E. Moule
 Gospel of Matthew, 1880 by the English Bible Society.

Jinhua dialect 
Romanized Vernacular Versions
 Gospel of John, 1866

Wenzhou dialect
 Matthew-Acts, 1890
 "THE FOUR GOSPELS AND ACTS, IN WENCHOW." was published in 1894 under the title of "Chaò-chî Yi-sû Chī-tuh Sang Iah Sing Shī: Sz̀ fuh-iang tà sź-du ae-djüe fa üe-tsiu t'û", literally 救主 耶稣 基督 新 约 圣 书: 四 福音 及 使徒行传 翻 温州语, with the entire book in Wenzhou dialect.

Taizhou (Zhejiang) dialect

 New Testament

Northern Min

Jian'ou dialect
Romanized Vernacular Versions
 Gospel of Mark, 1898 by the English Bible Society.
 Gospel of Matthew, 1900 by the Methodist Episcopal Mission Press. Translated by Hugh S. and Minnie Phillips.

Jianyang dialect
Romanized Vernacular Versions
 Gospel of Mark, 1898 by the English Bible Society.
 Gospel of Matthew, 1900 by the Methodist Episcopal Mission Press. Translated by Hugh S. and Minnie Phillips of the American Bible Society.

Eastern Min

Fuzhou dialect
Character Colloquial Versions
 Old Testament, 1875–1884
 New Testament, 1856
 Complete Bible (福州土腔聖經), 1937. Printed by the British and Foreign Bible Society and the American Bible Society.

Romanized Vernacular Versions
 Gospel of John, 1886
 Gospel of John, 1889
 New Testament, after 1890
 Foochow Colloquial Bible, 1908. Printed by the British and Foreign Bible Society in Fuzhou.

Southern Min

Amoy dialect

Romanized Vernacular Versions
 Old Testament, 1852–1884
 New Testament, about 1853-1873
 Gospel of Matthew, for Blind, 1888

Shantou dialect
Character Colloquial Versions
 Genesis, 1879
 Ruth, 1875
 Matthew-1 Corinthians, Philippians, 1 Thessalonians-Titus, Hebrews, 1 2 3 John, 1880–1884
Romanized Vernacular Versions
 Genesis, 1888
 Jonah, 1888
 Gospel of Matthew, 1889
 Gospel of Mark, 1890
 Gospel of Luke, 1876
 Acts, 1889
 James, 1888
(MATHEW TO ACTS: SWATOW DIALECT)

Teochew dialect

Romanized Vernacular Versions

11 Samuel. (Tie-chiu dialect.)
 New Testament, 1915 by English Presbyterian Missionary societies.

Hainan Junjiahua

Romanized Vernacular Versions
 Gospel of Matthew, 1891
 Gospel of John, 1893

Xinghua (Puxian) Min

Romanized Vernacular Versions
 Gospel of John, 1892 by the American Bible Society.
 Gospel of Mark, 1893
 Gospel of Matthew, 1894
 Acts, 1894
 Gospel of Luke, 1895

Gan Chinese

Shaowu dialect
Romanized Vernacular Versions
 Book of James, 1891 by the American Board of Commissioners for Foreign Missions.

Jianning dialect
 Gospel of Matthew, 1896 by the American Bible Society.
 Gospel of John, 1897 by the Bible Society of Great Britain in London.

Hakka

Character Colloquial Versions
 Genesis and Exodus, 1886
 Psalms, 1890
 New Testament, 1883
 Old Testament and New Testament, 1930 
Romanized Vernacular Versions
 Das Evangelium des Matthaeus im Volksdialekte der Hakka-Chinesen, 1860 by Rudolf Lechler
 New Testament, 1860–1883
 New Testament (Bible Society in Taiwan), 1993 (with the Psalms); Proverbs 1995

Dingzhou dialect
 Gospel of Matthew (Romanised), 1919

Wujingfu Hakka dialect (五经富)
 New Testament, 1916

Swatow Hakka Dialect
 New Testament, 1924

Taiwan Siyen Hakka dialect 
 Hakka Bible: Today's Taiwan Hakka Version, 2012

Yue Chinese (Cantonese)

Guangzhou dialect (Cantonese)
Translations into Cantonese include:

Character Colloquial Versions

 Genesis-Leviticus, Deuteronomy, Psalms, 1873–1888
 New Testament, 1872–1883
Romanized Vernacular Versions
 Gosepel of Luke, 1867
 Gospel of Mark, after 1890

Lianzhou dialect 
 Gospel of Matthew, 1904 by the American Bible Society. Translated by the Missionary Eleanor Chesnut.
 Gospel of Mark, 1905
 Gospel of Luke, 1905
 Gospel of John, 1905

Yangcheng dialect 
 Gospel of Matthew, 1862 by the American Presbyterian Church. Translated by Charles F. Preston.
 Gospel of John, 1862
Gospel of Luke, 1867 by the English Bible Society. Translated by Wilhelm Lauis.

Notable Translations

 Robert Morrison. 耶酥基利士督我主救者新遺詔書 : 俱依本言譯出 (Ye Su Ji Li Shi Du Wo Zhu Jiu Zhe Xin Yi Zhao Shu : Ju Yi Ben Yan Yi Chu). Canton, 1813. New Testament. Google Books
 遺詔全書, 1822
 神天聖書, 1823–1824
 Lassar-Marshman Version (遺詔全書, 1822)
 Morrison-Milne Version (神天聖書, 1823-1824)
 Delegates Version (委辦譯本 or 代表譯本, 1854)
 Archimandrite Gury's New Testament (新遺詔聖經, 1864) and Psalms (聖詠經, 1879)
 Chinese Union Version (和合本), 1904–1919
 Chinese Union Version (和合本, 1919 and 文理和合, 1934)
 Studium Biblicum Version (思高譯本), 1935–1968
 New Testament and paraphrase of Psalms by John C. Wu (新經全集 and 聖詠譯義), 1946
 Studium Biblicum Version (思高譯本, 1968)
 Lü Zhenzhong's version of the Bible (呂振中譯本, 1970)
 Chinese Living Bible (當代聖經, 1974)
 Today's Chinese Version (現代中文譯本), Dangdai shenjing 1979
 New Chinese Version (聖經新譯本), 1993
 Pastoral Bible (Chinese) (牧靈聖經), 1991–1999
 New World Translation (聖經新世界譯本 漢語版), 2001
 Recovery Version (聖經恢復本), 2003
 Chinese Contemporary Bible (当代译本, 2010)
 Chinese Standard Bible (中文標準譯本, 2011)
 Chinese NET Bible NET聖經（中譯本）, 2011-2012
 Contemporary Chinese Version (CCV), The New Testament, 《新約．新漢語譯本》, 2010
 Chinese New Living Translation (CNLT)《聖經．新普及譯本》, 2012
 Contemporary Chinese Version (CCV), The Pentateuch, 《五經．新漢語譯本》, 2014

Notes

References

 John R. Hykes. List of Translations of the Scriptures into the Chinese Language. (Yokohama, Japan: Fukuin Printing,  1915). Google Books (free download).
 

Bible Translations
 
Lists of Bible versions and translations